Pankesh raidas

CLG could refer to:

Places
 New Coalinga Municipal Airport, Fresno County, California, USA, IATA code
 Colgong railway station in Kahalgaon, Bhagalpur, Bihar, India, station code

Organizations
 Company limited by guarantee, in UK and Ireland
 Counter Logic Gaming, a professional esports organization
 Chalair Aviation (ICAO airline code: CLG) French regional airline
 WCLG-FM, a radio station in Morgantown, West Virginia, USA
 KCLG-LD, a defunct TV station in Neosho, Missouri, USA
 CLG, Gaelic Athletic Association

Other uses
 Guided missile light cruiser, US Navy ship classification